Millington Green may refer to:
 Millington, Connecticut, USA, including the Millington Green Historic District
 Millington Green, Derbyshire, a hamlet in Derbyshire, England, forming part of Hulland Ward